Dominique Da Sylva (born 16 August 1989) is a Mauritanian footballer who currently plays as a forward for Kuala Lumpur City and the Mauritanian national team. He spent time at the Académie de Football Nouakchott before joining Tunisian club CS Sfaxien in 2007. Four years later, he was transferred to Egyptian club Al-Ahly.

Early life
Da Silva was born in Nouakchott, Mauritania to Guinea-Bissau parents. He is Catholic.

Club career

He spent the 2006–07 season at the city's Académie de Football before joining Tunisian club CS Sfaxien in 2007. In his second season with Sfaxien, he scored four goals in ten appearances in Tunisia's top division, the Ligue Professionnelle 1. He scored three league goals in the 2009–10 campaign and two more the following season before joining Egyptian side Al-Ahly for $600,000 in January 2011. Da Silva scored three more goals during the 2010–11 campaign and helped the Al-Ahly win the Egyptian Premier League for the seventh successive season.  On 9 September 2012, he came on as a late substitute in Al-Ahly's 2–1 win over ENPPI in the Egyptian Super Cup.  In January 2014, Da Silva moved to Zamalek SC.  He made an immediate impression, scoring in each of his first four games.

In June 2017, he joined Vietnamese club Hồ Chí Minh City F.C., scoring two free-kicks on his debut. At the end of 2019, Da Sylva left Vietnam for Malaysia, signing with Terengganu F.C.

International career
He made his debut for the Mauritania national team in 2007 and scored 45 goals. He scored his first goal for his country against Morocco in 2008.

Honours
CS Sfaxien
 Tunisian President Cup: 2009

Al-Ahly
 Egyptian Premier League: 2010–11
 Egyptian Super Cup: 2011
 CAF Champions League: 2012, 2013

References

External links
 
 

1989 births
Living people
People from Nouakchott
Mauritanian people of Bissau-Guinean descent
Mauritanian Roman Catholics
Mauritanian footballers
Mauritanian expatriate footballers
Mauritania international footballers
Association football forwards
CS Sfaxien players
Al Ahly SC players
Zamalek SC players
Al Urooba Club players
Expatriate footballers in Tunisia
Expatriate footballers in Egypt
Expatriate footballers in the United Arab Emirates
Expatriate footballers in Cyprus
Expatriate footballers in Vietnam
Expatriate footballers in Malaysia
Mauritanian expatriate sportspeople in Tunisia
Mauritanian expatriate sportspeople in Egypt
Mauritanian expatriate sportspeople in the United Arab Emirates
Mauritanian expatriate sportspeople in Cyprus
Mauritanian expatriate sportspeople in Vietnam
Mauritanian expatriate sportspeople in Malaysia
Cypriot First Division players
Ermis Aradippou FC players
Egyptian Premier League players
UAE First Division League players
Kuala Lumpur City F.C. players
Saigon FC players
Ho Chi Minh City FC players